The Butcher Shop is the first mixtape presented by rapper Esham. Released in 2008, the album contains tracks from Detroit rappers such as Big Herk, L.A.R.S., Insane Clown Posse, Royce da 5'9" and Trick Trick. The album also features the entirety of Esham's extended play Lamb Chopz, previously released as a digital download on October 30, 2007. The Butcher Shop peaked at #86 on the Billboard Top R&B/Hip-Hop Albums chart.

Track listing

References

Hip hop compilation albums
Albums produced by Esham
2008 mixtape albums
Reel Life Productions compilation albums